The US Open Men's Qualifying Tournament ran from 21 August 2007 to 24 August 2007. Sixteen players qualified for the main draw, which started on Monday 27 August 2007.

Seeds
The seeded players are listed below. Players who have lost are listed with the round in which they exited.

 Frank Dancevic (qualified)
 Robin Haase (qualifying competition, lucky loser)
 Andrei Pavel (qualified)
 Michael Zverev (first round)
 Juan Pablo Brzezicki (second round)
 Olivier Patience (first round)
 Fabio Fognini (qualifying competition)
 Raemon Sluiter (first round)
 Bobby Reynolds (qualifying competition, lucky loser)
 Marin Čilić (first round)
 Dudi Sela (qualified)
 Federico Luzzi (second round)
 Paul Capdeville (qualified)
 Wesley Moodie (qualifying competition)
 Alejandro Falla (second round)
 Alex Bogdanovic (first round, retired)
 Thierry Ascione (qualified)
 Łukasz Kubot (qualifying competition)
 Pablo Cuevas (qualified)
 Tomáš Zíb (first round)
 Dick Norman (first round)
 Lukáš Dlouhý (second round)
 Jan Hernych (qualifying competition)
 Zack Fleishman (first round)
 Steve Darcis (qualified)
 Alexander Waske (qualified)
 Gilles Müller (first round)
 Viktor Troicki (first round)
 Adrián García (qualifying competition)
 Rainer Schüttler (qualified)
 Rik de Voest (qualified)
 Björn Phau (qualified)

Qualifiers

Lucky losers

Draw

First qualifier

Second qualifier

Third qualifier

Fourth qualifier

Fifth qualifier

Sixth qualifier

Seventh qualifier

Eighth qualifier

Ninth qualifier

Tenth qualifier

Eleventh qualifier

Twelfth qualifier

Thirteenth qualifier

Fourteenth qualifier

Fifteenth qualifier

Sixteenth qualifier

References
Results
2007 US Open – Men's draws and results at the International Tennis Federation

Men's Qualifying Singles
US Open (tennis) by year – Qualifying